Turnworth is a small village and civil parish in north Dorset, England, situated on the Dorset Downs  west of Blandford Forum. It consists of a few cottages and farmhouses scattered around a church and manor house. In 2013 the civil parish had an estimated population of 30.

In 1086 in the Domesday Book Turnworth was recorded as Torneworde; it had 19 households, was in Pimperne Hundred and the lord and tenant-in-chief was Alfred of 'Spain'.

The church, with the exception of the tower, was rebuilt in the 19th century with assistance from Thomas Hardy, who designed the capitals and possibly also the corbels. Hardy described Turnworth's position as being "stood in a hole, but the hole is full of beauty", and he used Turnworth House as the inspiration for Hintock House in his novel The Woodlanders.

Nearby is Ringmoor, an ancient settlement on the top of the scarp face of the downs.

The manor house in the area is Turnworth House, which was demolished in 1947.

References

External links

Villages in Dorset